Aba Cercato (born 1 May 1939) is an Italian former television presenter and announcer.

Life and career 
Born in Bologna, Cercato  joined RAI in 1959 as announcer. In 1961, she was the first announcer of Rai 2 and inaugurated its broadcasting service. Starting from the mid-1960s, she hosted several programs of various genres, ranging from music to medicine, politics, current events, and entertainment. In 1983 she left RAI to join Canale 5, where she presented the morning programs Buongiorno Italia and Come stai?.

She is the mother of actress Giulia Boschi.

References

External links 

 

Mass media people from Bologna
1939 births  
Living people
Italian television presenters
Italian women television presenters